The International Congress of Maritime Museums (ICMM) is the world's only international network of maritime museums, associations, and individuals devoted to maritime heritage, founded in 1972.  It has 120+ members of every size across thirty-five countries and six continents. It convenes biennial congresses hosted by different member museums around the world, publishes a monthly newsletter, and offers resources on its website on subjects including maritime archaeology, historic vessels and maritime curatorship.

External links 
 Official Website of ICMM

Museum associations and consortia
Maritime history events
History organizations
Maritime museums
Maritime history organizations
 Organizations established in 1972